Paras Masroor is a Pakistani theatre and television actor and screenwriter. 

He has played the role of Torah Khan in Momina Duraid's Sang-e-Mar Mar (2016) for which he received Hum Award for Best Supporting Actor. He further appeared in films Na Maloom Afrad (2014) and Mah e Mir (2016).

Early life
He belongs to a Sindhi Sufi family involved in the arts : his grandfather, Ghulam Ali Masroor, who went by the pen-name Faqeer, wrote Sufi poetry in six languages (Arabic, Persian, Urdu, Sindhi, Seraiki and English), while his father, Beydil Masroor, is a musician and writer who also served as senior director/producer for PTV for some 35 years, Paras inheriting his interest in arts from him, as he's himself involved in sculpture, painting, drawing and music as well (he can play the tabla and the guitar).

He got his Master's in sociology and mass communications from the Karachi University before studying acting at the NAPA.

Career
Starting his career as a theatre actor, he moved on to television. He also wrote content for different channels, such as scripts for Mohammed Ehteshamuddin, and also worked behind the camera as an assistant director.

Filmography

Theatre

Film

Television

Accolades

References

External links 

Year of birth missing (living people)
Living people
Pakistani male stage actors
Pakistani male film actors
Pakistani male television actors
21st-century Pakistani male actors
University of Karachi alumni
National Academy of Performing Arts alumni
Sindhi people